Cling may refer to:
 "Cling", a song by Days of the New from their 1997 album Days of the New (album)
 Cling, a C++ interpreter; see CINT
 "Cling Cling", a song by Japanese girl group Perfume from the 2014 album Cosmic Explorer
 Cling film or cling wrap, alternate term for plastic wrap, used for sealing food items
 Clinging, the English translation of Upādāna, a word used in both Buddhism and Hinduism
 Static cling, a natural phenomenon when things stick together due to static electricity

See also
 Clinge, a town in the Dutch province of Zeeland
 Clinger (disambiguation)